Neil Leslie Joseph Jeffrey (13 May 1916 – 6 July 2005) was an Australian rules footballer who played with North Melbourne in the Victorian Football League (VFL).

Notes

External links 

1916 births
2005 deaths
Australian rules footballers from Melbourne
North Melbourne Football Club players
People from Kensington, Victoria